The 1999 Belarusian Premier League was the ninth season of top-tier football in Belarus. It started on April 11 and ended on October 30, 1999. Dnepr-Transmash Mogilev were the defending champions.

Team changes from 1998 season
Dinamo-93 Minsk dissolved midway through 1998 season and FC Kommunalnik Slonim relegated to the First League after finishing in the last place. They were replaced by 1998 First League winners Lida, who previously played in Premier League as Obuvshchik Lida, and the newcomers Svisloch-Krovlya Osipovichi, First League runners-up. Torpedo Minsk changed their name to Torpedo-MAZ Minsk and Neman Grodno were renamed to Neman-Belcard Grodno.

Overview
BATE Borisov won their 1st champions title and qualified for the next season's Champions League. The championship runners-up and 1999–2000 Cup winners Slavia Mozyr as well as bronze medalists Gomel qualified for UEFA Cup. Newcomers Svisloch-Krovlya Osipovichi finished their first and the only season in top league in 15th place and relegated, as did 16th team Molodechno.

Teams and venues

Table

Results

Belarusian clubs in European Cups

Top scorers

See also
1999 Belarusian First League
1998–99 Belarusian Cup
1999–2000 Belarusian Cup

External links
RSSSF

Belarusian Premier League seasons
1
Belarus
Belarus